The Metter Downtown Historic District is a historic district in Metter, Georgia which was listed on the National Register of Historic Places in 2011.

It includes:
Candler County Courthouse (1921), separately NRHP-listed
U. S. Post Office (1960)
Metter Bank Company (1904), later a BB&T, now office of an LLP, with a marble façade
Allied Building (1930)
Broad Street Market (c.1900)
Masonic Building (1916)
Dixie Theater (1930s)
Metter Depot (1902, 1914).  Wood frame depot with board-and-batten siding, moved to current location in 1950s.
two churches

References

External links
 
Better Downtown, Metter DDA website

Historic districts on the National Register of Historic Places in Georgia (U.S. state)
National Register of Historic Places in Candler County, Georgia